Fath Expressway is an expressway located in West Tehran starting at Fath Square and joining Road 32 at the end.

References

External links 

 Iran road map on Young Journalists Club

Expressways in Tehran
Roads in Iran